Ibn-Al-Hytham Islamic School is a government-recognised expatriate institution in the Kingdom of Bahrain catering to education while adhering to the tenets of Islam. 

Islamic ideology guides the school in all aspects of its activities. It has 250 teachers and more than 2500 students. It is a private school.

Campus
The school has two campuses; one in the capital city of Manama(L.K.G to H.K.G) and one in the village of Maqsha(1 to 12). Girls and boys study in separate blocks and strict Islamic discipline is followed.

References

External links
Official website

Educational institutions established in 1989
Schools in Bahrain
Education in Manama
Ibn al-Haytham
1989 establishments in Bahrain